Matt Barton (born 4 February 1996, in Geelong) is an Australian motorcycle racer. As of 2015, he races in the Australian 125GP/Moto3 Championship aboard a FTR Honda.

Career statistics

Grand Prix motorcycle racing

By season

Races by year

References

External links
Profile on MotoGP.com

Australian motorcycle racers
Living people
1996 births
Moto3 World Championship riders